Mika Konaka (born February 24, 1977, in Tokoro, Hokkaido, Japan as Mika Hori) is a Japanese curler, a  and a two-time Japan women's champion (1999, 2001).

She played for Japan at the 2002 Winter Olympics, where the Japanese team finished in eighth place.

Teams

References

External links
 
 Mika Konaka - Curling - 2002 Winter Olympic Games - Nihon Olympic Iinkai  (Japanese Olympic Committee - JOC)

Living people
1977 births
Sportspeople from Hokkaido
Japanese female curlers
Pacific-Asian curling champions
Japanese curling champions
Curlers at the 2002 Winter Olympics
Olympic curlers of Japan
20th-century Japanese women
21st-century Japanese women